Sven Loll (born 4 April 1964 in Berlin) is a retired male judoka from Germany, who competed for East Germany at the 1988 Summer Olympics in Seoul, South Korea. There he won the silver medal in the Men's Lightweight (– 71 kg) division after being defeated in the final by France's Marc Alexandre.

References
sports-reference

1964 births
Living people
German male judoka
Judoka at the 1988 Summer Olympics
Olympic judoka of East Germany
Olympic silver medalists for East Germany
Sportspeople from Berlin
Medalists at the 1988 Summer Olympics
Olympic medalists in judo
20th-century German people